Variations on A Love Supreme is a jazz album composed by Fabrizio Cassol and Kris Defoort.  It contains variations on A Love Supreme, the classic jazz album by the John Coltrane quartet.  It was released in 1995 on the De Werf label, and is representative of the Belgian jazz scene.

Variations on A Love Supreme is also the name of the big band (led by Kris Defoort and Fabrizio Cassol) performing those compositions, for example at La Monnaie, Brussels in 1999.  Some musicians were replaced for some concerts; for example, Michel Massot by Geoffroy De Masure, and George Alexander Van Dam by Dominique Pifarely or Gunda Gottschalk.

Track listing

Part one
 "The Seed" — composition by Kris Defoort and Fabrizio Cassol
 "Variation 1" — F. Cassol
 "Variation 2: Pursuance" — John Coltrane, arrangement by F. Cassol
 "Variation 3" — F. Cassol

Part two
 "Variation 4" — F. Cassol
 "Variation 5" — K. Defoort
 "Variation 6: Resolution" — John Coltrane, arrangement by K. Defoort

Part three
 "Variation 7" — K. Defoort
 "Variation 8" — K. Defoort

Personnel
 Fabrizio Cassol — alto saxophone
 Kris Defoort — piano
 Jeroen Van Herzeele — tenor and soprano saxophone
 Pierre Bernard — flute
 Antoine Prawerman — clarinet
 Jan Kuijken — cello
 Laurent Blondiau — trumpet
 George Alexander Van Dam — violin
 Michel Massot — trombone, tuba
 Stéphane Galland — drums
 Michel Hatzigeorgiou — bass

External links
 De Werf
 Jazz in Belgium
 Abeille musique

1995 albums
Jazz albums by Belgian artists
John Coltrane tribute albums